A double bass array (DBA) is a specific layout of subwoofers within a rectangular listening space. It removes unwanted room related resonances (modes) over a wide listening area.

Preface 
A DBA requires at least two subwoofers (preferably same make and model) that are placed at opposing walls in a specific layout. The signal played by the subwoofer array on the back wall is inverted and delayed based on the distance to the frontal subwoofer array. This will actively "absorb" any reflected sound.

Design

Array layout 

Modes between side walls, floor and ceiling are suppressed by arranging the subwoofer in a specific grid:

: Wall width

: Wall height

: Horizontal distance from wall ( for n=0 in picture)

: Vertical distance from wall ( for n=0 in picture)

: Number of subwoofers horizontally

: Number of subwoofers vertically

Counter 

With this specific grid layout reflections from the walls act as mirror sources. Interference of the subwoofers and mirror sources create a plane wave up to a certain frequency. The more sources the higher the frequency. This cutoff frequency  can be calculated for each dimension as follows:

: Speed of sound

: Distance between subwoofers

Example: A 2 × 2 array on a wall measuring 4 × 3 m would work up to 86Hz horizontally  and up to 114Hz vertically .

Active Absorption 

Due to the specific grid layout of the subwoofer array most modal effects are suppressed. The length modes on the other hand get fully excited. The array on the back wall will emit a polarity inverted wave at the very same moment the wave from the front wall hits the back wall. Reflection and inverted wave will interfere with each other destructively so the reflection is canceled. This is also known as "active absorption".

The necessary delay  of the back array is based on the length  of the room:

: Speed of sound

The necessary delay required for a DBA is available in most digital equalizers or digital crossovers. Polarity of the back array can easily be achieved by inverting the signal coming from the amps or by swapping the cables going to the driver. Most active subwoofers also offer a polarity switch.

Pros 
 Sound pressure level throughout the room is very even.
 Modal resonances are reduced to a minimum.
 Subwoofers should be placed as close as possible on the wall where they easily can be made invisible.
 No bulky acoustic room treatments or even structural modifications necessary.
 Simple setup.

Cons 
 Rooms properties and furniture can interfere with the propagation of the plane wave.
 Frequency range of the plane wave depends on the number of drivers which can be quite high in large rooms.
 As the back wall array is only used to cancel the energy of the frontal array the overall efficiency isn't good.
 SPL throughout the room is virtually constant which might affect tonal balance with satellite speakers that fall off with listening distance.

Notes 
A DBA just requires two opposing walls, so it is possible to have one array on the floor and the other on the ceiling, or one on the left wall and the other on the right. However, low frequencies become localizable at a specific frequency, so in most cases it's probably a good idea to use the walls with the lower distance of separation.

The effectiveness of DBA largely depends on the room's physical characteristics.
 The room should be rectangular
 Walls should be rigid
 Measuring equipment helps to dial in the necessary delay
 The smaller the room, the better

References 

Original white paper by Anselm Goertz in German
Visualize modes within a rectangular room
DBA installations with measurements
Subwoofer & speaker

Film and video technology
Bass (sound)
Loudspeaker technology
Home video